Jazz is a perfume for men by Yves Saint Laurent introduced in 1988.  The black and white packaging and flacon were designed to resemble piano keys.
A flanker Live Jazz was introduced in 1998.

References

External links
 Jazz at Basenotes

Perfumes
Products introduced in 1988
Yves Saint Laurent (brand)